Love Me Instead is a 2021 Turkish film directed by Mehmet Ada Öztekin and starring Sarp Akkaya, Ercan Kesal, Songül Öden and Aleyna Özgeçen. The film was released by Netflix on November 19, 2021.

Cast 
 Sarp Akkaya - Musa
 Ercan Kesal - Sedat
 Aleyna Özgeçen - Yonca/Leyla
 Songül Öden - Nuriye
 Ushan Çakır - Inspector 1
 Doğukan Polat - Inspector 2
 Füsun Demirel - Nebahat
 Sinan Arslan - Haluk
 Ali Seçkiner Alici - Apo
 Su Burcu Yazgi Çoşkun - Selen
 Serpil Özcan - Nihan
 Kaan Altay Köprülü - Emre
 Onur Bilge - Kadir
 Güner Özkul - Gülendam
 Melis Adaş
 Yıldırım Burak Deniz

References

External links 
 
 

2021 films
Turkish drama films
2020s Turkish-language films
Turkish-language Netflix original films